The 2017 İstanbul Cup (also known as the TEB BNP Paribas İstanbul Cup for sponsorship reasons) was a tennis tournament played on outdoor clay courts. It was the 10th edition of the İstanbul Cup, and part of the WTA International tournaments of the 2017 WTA Tour. It took place in Istanbul, Turkey, from 24 April through 30 April 2017.

Points and prize money

Prize money

Singles main-draw entrants

Seeds

 Rankings are as of April 17, 2017.

Other entrants
The following players received wildcards into the singles main draw:
  Ayla Aksu
  İpek Soylu
  Dayana Yastremska

The following player received entry as a special exempt:
  Markéta Vondroušová

The following players received entry from the qualifying draw:
  Alexandra Cadanțu 
  Başak Eraydın
  Fiona Ferro
  Viktoria Kamenskaya 
  Elizaveta Kulichkova
  Conny Perrin

The following players received entry as a lucky loser:
  Anna Kalinskaya

Withdrawals 
Before the tournament
  Lara Arruabarrena → replaced by  Sara Sorribes Tormo
  Vania King → replaced by  Chang Kai-chen
  Magda Linette → replaced by  Kateryna Kozlova
  Yulia Putintseva → replaced by  Çağla Büyükakçay
  Patricia Maria Țig → replaced by  Maryna Zanevska
  Markéta Vondroušová → replaced by  Anna Kalinskaya
  Wang Qiang → replaced by  Sara Errani

Doubles main-draw entrants

Seeds 

 1 Rankings as of April 17, 2017.

Other entrants 
The following pairs received wildcards into the doubles main draw:
  Ayla Aksu /  Dayana Yastremska
  Pemra Özgen /  Melis Sezer

Champions

Singles

  Elina Svitolina def.  Elise Mertens, 6–2, 6–4

Doubles

  Dalila Jakupović /  Nadiia Kichenok def.  Nicole Melichar /  Elise Mertens,  7–6(8–6), 6–2

References

External links
 Official website 
 Players list 

2017 in Istanbul
2017 in Turkish tennis
Istanbul Cup
Istan
İstanbul Cup